Alan Cheyne Baxter  (19 August 1911 – 14 July 1976) was a New Zealand politician of the Labour Party.

Biography

Early life and career
Baxter was born on 19 August 1911 at Egmont Village. He gained his education at New Plymouth Boys' High School and subsequently at Feilding Agricultural College. Before the war, Baxter was a shepherd in the Wairarapa. While living there he joined the trade union movement in 1939.

He joined the Royal New Zealand Air Force (RNZAF) in March 1940 and was a flight lieutenant. He was awarded the DFC in October 1942 for his actions in the Dieppe Raid, with a Bar awarded in 1945. The citation for the 1942 award read:

On August 19th, 1942, he was observer in the leading aircraft of a formation which participated in the combined operations at Dieppe. When the formation was attacked by some 20 enemy fighters, Pilot Officer Baxter calmly gave directions to his captain, and subsequently his skilful navigation was an essential contribution to the success achieved by the formation and to its safe return to base.

According to one of his navigators, he flew more bombing missions over Germany than any other New Zealand airman (and came back alive).  During one period of raids, he lost seven room mates in five days. One personal escape involved bending over to pick up a map, with a shot of flak shooting through the seat where he had been sitting only a moment before. On the bombing of Germany, he stated it was something that had to be done to stop Hitler, but every time they were let go, he felt for "the poor blighters below".

Following the war he settled first on Ōtorohanga, then in Huntly. Baxter worked as clerk with seed and fertiliser merchants for two years in Feilding and Hawera. He later became a prominent member of a movement to increase living standards of rural employees.

Political career

Baxter contested the 1946 by-election in the Raglan electorate for the Labour Party, but lost against Hallyburton Johnstone of the National Party. Later in the same year, Baxter defeated Johnstone in the 1946 general election by just 13 votes. Johnstone in turn defeated Baxter in 1949. He was the last Labour candidate to win a seat in the area.

A notable characteristic of his parliamentary period was that he was respected as a man who never compromised his principles.

Later life and death
After he lost his seat in Parliament he worked in the coal mines in Huntly. In 1962 he retired and moved to Auckland.

Baxter died in 1976 after a short illness. He was survived by his wife Sylvia and three daughters.

Notes

References

External links 
1946 photo

1911 births
1976 deaths
New Zealand Labour Party MPs
New Zealand World War II pilots
Royal New Zealand Air Force personnel
New Zealand MPs for North Island electorates
Unsuccessful candidates in the 1949 New Zealand general election
Unsuccessful candidates in the 1957 New Zealand general election
Unsuccessful candidates in the 1960 New Zealand general election
New Zealand military personnel of World War II
Members of the New Zealand House of Representatives
Recipients of the Distinguished Flying Cross (United Kingdom)
People educated at New Plymouth Boys' High School
People educated at Feilding High School